Empress Dowager He (何太后) may refer to:

Empress He (Han dynasty) (died 189), consort and empress dowager of the Han dynasty
Empress Dowager He (Eastern Wu) ( 242–264), empress dowager of the Eastern Wu state
Empress He (Tang dynasty) (died 905), consort and empress dowager of the Tang Dynasty

See also
Empress He (disambiguation)

He